The Chasle YC-12 Tourbillon ("Whirlwind") was a single-seat light sporting aircraft developed in France in the mid-1960s and marketed for homebuilding via plans. It was a low-wing cantilever monoplane of conventional configuration. As designed, it featured fixed tailwheel undercarriage, but it could also be fitted with fixed tricycle gear.

The Tourbillon flew for the first time on 9 October 1965. Though fifteen sets of plans were sold, only two other Tourbillons were built, both in the UK. The prototype remains on the French Civil register but the two UK aircraft are now deregistered.  Their engine types are not recorded in the registration documents.

Variants
YC-12
prototype with Continental A65 engine
YC-121
similar to prototype with enlarged tailfin for limited certification 
YC-122
similar to YC-121 but with Continental C90 engine
YC-123
similar to YC-121 but with Potez 4E-20b engine

Specifications (typical YC-121)

References

Further reading
 
 

1960s French sport aircraft
Homebuilt aircraft
Low-wing aircraft
Single-engined tractor aircraft
Tourbillon
Aircraft first flown in 1965